Close Call is a 2004 crime-drama film directed by Jimmy Lee. The movie is about Jenny Kim, a 16-year-old Korean American who is caught in an underground world of crimes, drugs and sex.

Writer/director Jimmy Lee is the father of Annie Lee, who played the film's lead character, and Angie Lee, who co-produced the film and played a supporting character.

Cast 

Annie Lee - Jenny Kim
Philip Moon - David Kim
Christine Ma - Joanne Kim
Jeff Fahey - Elliot Krasner
Kaye Lu - Young Jenny

References

External links 

American crime drama films
2004 crime drama films
2004 films
American coming-of-age drama films
American teen drama films
Films about Korean Americans
Films set in California
2000s English-language films
2000s American films
English-language crime drama films